Elko may refer to:

Place names

Canada
Elko, British Columbia

United States
Elko, Nevada
Elko County, Nevada
Elko, Georgia
Elko, Minnesota
Elko, Missouri
Elko, New York
Elko Tract in Henrico County, Virginia 
Elko, South Carolina
Elko New Market, Minnesota

Transportation
Elko Station, a passenger rail station in Elko, Nevada
Elko Regional Airport, an airport in Elko, Nevada
Elko/Lionel P. Demers Memorial Airpark, an airport near Elko, British Columbia

Other uses
Elko (album), a live album by Railroad Earth
Elko (surname), surname
ELKO field, a spinor field in theoretical physics
Elko Grupa, a Latvia-based IT company
Elko, the Icelandic brand used by the Nordic consumer electronics retailer Elkjøp